Okpo Land was a short-lived amusement park based in the outskirts of Okpo-dong, South Korea. It opened in 1996 and was shut down in May 1999, allegedly after a series of fatal accidents, in particular the death of a child who fell from the duck rollercoaster ride. The legitimacy of these claims have been put in dispute for several years, with the rumors believed to be originating from a derailed cart from the rollercoaster ride. A more likely reasoning behind the closure of the park was said to have been due to financial issues deriving from an economic crisis that affected South Korea from 1997 through 1998. 

The remnants of Okpo Land were demolished in 2011, so that a hotel could be constructed on its former location.

References

External links
Okpo Land at Urban Exploration Resources (includes photo galleries)

Amusement parks in South Korea
Defunct amusement parks
1999 disestablishments in South Korea
Amusement parks closed in 1999
Geoje